Russian Jews in Israel are immigrants and descendants of the immigrants of the Russian Jewish communities, who now reside within the State of Israel. They were around 900,000 in 2007. This refers to all post-Soviet Jewish diaspora groups, not only Russian Jews, but also Mountain Jews, Crimean Karaites, Krymchaks, Bukharan Jews, and Georgian Jews.

Immigration history

The largest number of Russian Jews now live in Israel. Israel is home to a core Russian-Jewish population of 900,000, and an enlarged population of 1,200,000 (including halakhically non-Jewish members of Jewish households, but excluding those who reside in Israel illegally). The Aliyah in the 1990s accounts for 85–90% of this population.

The population growth rate for Former Soviet Union (FSU) immigrants were among the lowest for any Israeli groups, with a fertility rate of 1.70 and natural increase of just +0.5% per year. The increase in Jewish birth rate in Israel during the 2000–2007 period was partly due to the increasing birth rate among the FSU immigrants, who now form 20% of the Jewish population of Israel.
96.5% of the enlarged Russian Jewish population in Israel is either Jewish or non-religious, while 3.5% (35,000) belongs to other religions (mostly Christians) and about 10,000 so-called "messianic Jews".

The Total Fertility Rate for FSU immigrants in Israel is given in the table below. The TFR increased with time, peaking in 1997, then slightly decreased after that, and then again increased after 2000.

In 1999, about 1,037,000 FSU immigrants lived in Israel, of whom about 738,900 immigrated after 1989. The second largest ethnic group (Moroccans) numbered just 1,000,000. From 2000–2006, 142,638 FSU immigrants moved to Israel. While 70,000 of them emigrated from Israel to countries like the U.S. and Canada, bringing the total population to 1,150,000 by 2007 January (excluding illegals). The natural increase was around 0.3% in late 1990s. For example 2,456 in 1996 (7,463 births to 5,007 deaths), 2,819 in 1997 (8,214 to 5,395), 2,959 in 1998 (8,926 to 5,967) and 2,970 in 1999 (9,282 to 6,312). In 1999, the natural growth was +0.385%. (Figures only for FSU immigrants moved in after 1989).

An estimated 45,000 illegal immigrants from the Former Soviet Union lived in Israel during the end of 2010, but it is not clear how many of them are actually Jews.

Currently, Russia has the highest rate of aliyah to Israel among any other country. In 2013, 7,520 people, nearly 40% of all olim, immigrated to Israel from the former Soviet Union.

Political history
Russian Jews have been very dominant in Israeli politics, due to large number of Russian Jews occupied in the official positions of Israeli Government. Former Israeli Foreign Minister, Avigdor Lieberman, was born in former Soviet Union's Moldova. Many Russian Jews maintain their ties with Russia, and play an important role in the relationship between Russia and Israel.

Demographics
Russian-speaking Jews in Israel include an enlarged population of 1,200,000, if including halakhically non-Jewish members of Jewish households. 96.5% of the enlarged Russian Jewish population in Israel is either Jewish or non-religious, while 3.5% (35,000) belong to other religions (mostly Christianity) and about 10,000 identifying as Messianic Jews separate from Jewish Christians.

Core Jewish population
Soviet and Russian-origin Jews form a core population of around 900,000 in Israel, as of 2007.

Mixed families

Some 300,000 halakhically non-Jewish members of Jewish households lived in Israel, as of 2007.

Notable people

Natan Sharansky
Yuri Foreman
Yuri Stern
Yuli-Yoel Edelstein
Yoel Razvozov
Vladimir Beliak
Evgeny Sova
Alex Kushnir
Elina Bardach-Yalov
Tania Mazarsky
Yulia Malinovsky
Nachman Dushanski
Boris Gelfand
Natasha Mozgovaya
Avigdor Lieberman
Anastassia Michaeli
Haim Megrelashvili
Victor Mikhalevski
Evgeny Postny
Maxim Rodshtein
Tatiana Zatulovskaya
Maria Gorokhovskaya
Katia Pisetsky
Aleksandr Averbukh
Anna Smashnova
Jan Talesnikov
Vadim Alexeev
Michael Kolganov
Alexander Danilov
Evgenia Linetskaya
Marina Kravchenko
David Kazhdan
Leonid Nevzlin
Vadim Akolzin
Roman Bronfman
Michael Cherney
Victoria Veinberg Filanovsky
Sergei Sakhnovski
Roman Zaretski
Alexandra Zaretski
Larisa Trembovler
Boris Tsirelson
Daniel Samohin
Margarita Levieva
Anna Zak
Diana Golbi
Arkadi Duchin
Arcadi Gaydamak
Neta Rivkin
Artem Dolgopyat
Eliezer Sherbatov

See also 
Aliyah
Refusenik
1970s Soviet Union aliyah
1990s Post-Soviet aliyah
Russian language in Israel
History of the Jews in Russia
Jewish ethnic divisions
Israel–Russia relations
Russians in Israel

References 

Israeli Jews by national origin
Israeli people of Russian-Jewish descent